Maria Fjodorovna Zibold (Marie Siebold) (1849–1939), was a Russian and Serbian physician.  Born in St. Petersburg, she studied in Zurich and Bern from 1870-1874 and qualified in 1874. She first obtained recognition as a surgeon in a military hospital in Serbia during the Russo-Turkish War of 1877/78 and then practiced in Belgrade from 1878-1888. Exiled for safety reasons, she was active in Constantinople for 17 years, until a harem intrigue led to her expulsion. After unsuccessful practice in Belgrade, she was active in Egyptian hospitals from 1907. On the outbreak of war in 1914, she returned to Serbia and was imprisoned by the Bulgarians with a military hospital in Albania.

References

1849 births
1939 deaths
Serbian surgeons
19th-century women physicians
19th-century Serbian women